Ryan Michael Fecteau (born September 18, 1992) is the Speaker of the Maine House of Representatives. A Democrat, Fecteau serves Maine House District 11, consisting of a portion of Biddeford. At the time of his election as Speaker of the House in December 2020, Fecteau was both the youngest active state Speaker in the United States and the first openly gay person to serve as Speaker of the Maine House.

Fecteau was born and raised in Biddeford, Maine and graduated from Biddeford High School. He attended the Catholic University of America where he was active in student government and LGBTQ+ advocacy. He was first elected to Maine House District 11 in 2014 when he was 21 years old and was re-elected in 2016, 2018 and 2020. In November 2018, Fecteau was elected Assistant Majority Leader of the Maine House, and in December 2020 he was elected Speaker of the House. He is an account executive at Catalist.

Early life and education
Fecteau is a native of Biddeford, Maine and the grandson of French-Canadian immigrants. He was raised by a single mother who worked in healthcare, and Fecteau grew up in subsidized housing; the family often relied on the Supplemental Nutrition Assistance Program for food. Fecteau graduated from Biddeford High School, spending two years as the student representative to the Biddeford School Committee during his time there.

After high school, Fecteau attended the Catholic University of America where he majored in both political science and theological & religious studies. He was the president of the CUAllies, the University's LGBTQ+ advocacy group, and led a campaign to have the group officially recognized by the University, an effort which ultimately failed. While at CUA, Fecteau was the first openly gay speaker of the Student Government General Assembly and completed internships at the Democratic National Committee, the Human Rights Campaign, Catalist, and in the office of US Representative Chellie Pingree. He was the first person in his family to graduate from college.

Career
Fecteau has worked as a field organizer for Mainers United for Marriage in 2012, was the chairman of the Biddeford Democractic Committee from 2011 to 2012, and was an editorial director at Trueline Publishing in Portland, Maine. He has worked at several Ogunquit, Maine businesses since 2014 and at the Perkins Cove. In late 2020, he was hired as an account executive at Catalist.

Political experience

In 2013, while he was still a student at CUA, Fecteau began his campaign for Maine House District 11. He traveled to Maine on weekends to campaign and recruited friends to call voters during the weekends when he could not make the trip. Fecteau defeated fellow Democrat David Flood 65%-35% in the 2014 House District 11 Democratic primary and beat Republican Debi Davis 67%-33% in the general election. He was 21, the third-youngest member of the Maine legislature and the youngest openly gay state representative in the United States.

Fecteau ran unopposed in the 2016 Democratic primary and defeated Republican Renee Morin 68%-32%.

Assistant Majority Leader
In 2018, Fecteau was again unopposed in the primary and defeated Republican Emily Rousseau 62%-38%. On November 16, 2018, the Maine House Democrats elected him Assistant House Majority Leader. Matt Moonen served as Majority Leader and Sara Gideon was the House Speaker. Fecteau’s signature legislation was a ban on the harmful practice of conversion therapy in Maine. In 2018, despite the Legislature’s support, Governor LePage was the only Republican Governor in the nation to veto a conversion therapy bill. In 2019, Governor Janet Mills signed the bill into law. Fecteau also worked on a bipartisan measure to expand affordable housing in Maine, the single largest investment in housing in Maine’s history.

House Speaker
Fecteau ran unopposed in both the House District 11 Democratic primary and the general election in 2020. On December 2, 2020, the Maine House elected him as their 103rd Speaker. While Fecteau ordinarily would have been sworn in by Governor Janet Mills, Mills was quarantining after possible exposure to COVID-19, so Acting Chief Justice of the Maine Supreme Judicial Court Andrew Mead conducted the ceremony instead. At the time of his swearing-in, Fecteau was the youngest presiding officer in the United States, the youngest Maine House speaker since 1842 and the first out speaker in Maine history. 

During his time as Speaker, he worked with Senate President Troy Jackson to pass LD 1, the COVID-19 Patient Bill of Rights and continue the work of the 130th Legislature through a hybrid model of virtual public hearings and occasional distanced sessions at a Civic Center before returning to the state house in June 2021. His bill to expand dental care to 217,000 low-income Mainers was funded as part of the biennial budget. Fecteau's multi-year efforts to fund capital improvements for Maine’s career and technical education centers finally passed in 2021 through his bill for $20 million and an additional $20 million was designated through American Rescue Plan funding. In June 2020 Fecteau joined with Republicans to defeat a bill aiming to extend overtime protections to farm workers; however, he did back a bill to provide farm workers the right to organize.  In the same year, legislation he worked on to reform the state’s troubled unemployment insurance system became law. Because of another bill passed by Speaker Fecteau in 2021, Maine municipalities could be incentivized to adopt zoning ordinances that encourage more affordable housing in Maine towns. He authored legislation that allowed property owners to build an accessory dwelling unit on lots previously zoned exclusively for single-family housing.

Personal life and recognition
Fecteau lives in Biddeford with his Goldendoodle, Pancake. In 2015, he received Youth Innovator of the Year award from The Trevor Project, a group focused on suicide prevention among lesbian, gay, bisexual, transgender, questioning, and queer youth, at their annual TrevorLIVE event.

Electoral history

References

External links
 
 Legislative page

1992 births
21st-century American politicians
American people of French-Canadian descent
Catholic University of America alumni
Catholics from Maine
Democratic Party members of the Maine House of Representatives
Gay politicians
LGBT Roman Catholics
LGBT state legislators in Maine
Living people
Politicians from Biddeford, Maine
Speakers of the Maine House of Representatives
Biddeford High School alumni